is a Japanese football player. She plays for Sanfrecce Hiroshima Regina in the WE League. She played for Japan national team.

Club career
Fukumoto was born in Ibusuki on October 2, 1983. After graduating from high school, she joined for Okayama Yunogo Belle in 2001. She was selected Best Eleven 3 times (2006, 2012 and 2014). She played 259 matches at the club. In August 2016, she moved to INAC Kobe Leonessa. However she could hardly play in the match. In 2019, she moved to Chifure AS Elfen Saitama.

National team career
In August 2002, Fukumoto was selected by the Japan U-20 national team for the 2002 U-19 World Championship. In October, she was selected by the Japan national team for the 2002 Asian Games. At this competition, on October 4, she debuted against Vietnam. She played in the World Cup 3 times (2007, 2011 and 2015) and at the Summer Olympics 2 times (2008 and 2012). Japan won the championship at the 2011 World Cup, came second in the 2015 World Cup and got a silver medal in the 2012 Summer Olympics. She played 81 games for Japan until 2016.

National team statistics

References

External links

Japan Football Association

1983 births
Living people
Association football people from Kagoshima Prefecture
Japanese women's footballers
Japan women's international footballers
Nadeshiko League players
Okayama Yunogo Belle players
INAC Kobe Leonessa players
Chifure AS Elfen Saitama players
Asian Games medalists in football
Footballers at the 2002 Asian Games
Footballers at the 2006 Asian Games
2007 FIFA Women's World Cup players
2011 FIFA Women's World Cup players
2015 FIFA Women's World Cup players
Olympic footballers of Japan
Olympic silver medalists for Japan
Olympic medalists in football
Medalists at the 2012 Summer Olympics
Footballers at the 2008 Summer Olympics
Footballers at the 2012 Summer Olympics
Women's association football goalkeepers
Asian Games silver medalists for Japan
Asian Games bronze medalists for Japan
Medalists at the 2002 Asian Games
Medalists at the 2006 Asian Games
FIFA Women's World Cup-winning players
Sanfrecce Hiroshima Regina players